Mons Gruithuisen Delta is a mountain of the surface of the Moon. It is located north of Gruithuisen crater, east of Mons Gruithuisen Gamma. It has an altitude of about 1800 meters and a diameter of about 27 kilometers. The name, given in 1935, was named after Franz von Gruithuisen, a German astronomer.

The mountain has an extremely low bulk density of 2150 kg/m3.

See also
Volcanism on the Moon

References

Gruithuisen Delta
Volcanoes on the Moon